Pegasus is a new town in the Waimakariri District of Canterbury, New Zealand. Named for the nearby Pegasus Bay, it is adjacent to the town of Woodend and is 25 km north of Christchurch. Once fully constructed, Pegasus will be home to up to 6000 people. The town will have approximately 1700 residential house sites. Retail and office space is located in the centre of the town adjacent to Lake Pegasus.

The project was first proposed in 1997 by Southern Capital and was initially developed by Infinity Investment Group of Wānaka.  The project ran into financial trouble in late 2012, with the developers going into receivership. Todd Property bought it for an undisclosed sum in December 2012 and undertook infrastructure development to complete the project, selling to the Templeton Group in 2019.

History
The master-planned design of town was the brainchild of businessman Bob Robertson. This was a first for New Zealand, and the initial marketing involved a gala auction event around a scale model of the project.

Mid 2006, major earthworks and site contouring began
December 2007, discovery of an early pā on the golf course site
January 2008, first titles to land in the town were issued
September 2008, first residents moved into the town
November 2008, showhome village opened
December 2009, Pegasus Golf & Sports Club, Lake Pegasus

As at May 2016 over 90% of all Pegasus sections have been titled and sold. Over 950 houses have been completed or are currently under construction and the population is now over 2500.

At the heart of the town, Lake Pegasus has become a venue for regional and national sporting events including national triathlons, dragon boat regattas, dive schools and sailing events.

The community centre opened in August 2017.

In October 2019, Todd Property sold its property interests to Templeton group, a major partner in NZ Prop Co Ltd. (NZPL).

Demographics 

Pegasus had a population of 2,637 at the 2018 New Zealand census, an increase of 1,620 people (159.3%) since the 2013 census, and an increase of 2,619 people (14550.0%) since the 2006 census. There were 936 households, with 939 occupied private dwellings and a further 51 unoccupied private dwellings. There were 1,293 males and 1,344 females, giving a sex ratio of 0.96 males per female. The median age was 39 years (compared with 37.4 years nationally), with 645 people (24.5%) aged under 15 years, 351 (13.3%) aged 15 to 29, 1,263 (47.9%) aged 30 to 64, and 378 (14.3%) aged 65 or older.

Ethnicities were 90.9% European/Pākehā, 7.8% Māori, 1.6% Pacific peoples, 4.6% Asian, and 2.7% other ethnicities (totals add to more than 100% since people could identify with multiple ethnicities).

The proportion of people born overseas was 30.6%, compared with 27.1% nationally.

Although some people objected to giving their religion, 53.2% had no religion, 37.9% were Christian, 0.6% were Hindu, 0.3% were Muslim, 0.5% were Buddhist and 1.3% had other religions.

Of those at least 15 years old, 408 (20.5%) people had a bachelor or higher degree, and 279 (14.0%) people had no formal qualifications. The median income was $40,600, compared with $31,800 nationally. The employment status of those at least 15 was that 1,062 (53.3%) people were employed full-time, 315 (15.8%) were part-time, and 54 (2.7%) were unemployed.

Education
Pegasus Bay School is a state co-educational full primary school located on Solander Road, with a roll of  students (as of  The school was formed from the previous Waikuku School, established in 1872, which had outgrown its original Waikuku site. The school relocated to its current site over the two-week term break in April 2014, and was renamed Pegasus Bay School.

For secondary education, the town is zoned for Kaiapoi High School, 13 km away in Kaiapoi. The town was previously also zoned for Rangiora High School, 10 km away in Rangiora, but overcrowding at Rangiora and the need to balance the student population between Rangiora and Kaiapoi led the boundary move to exclude Pegasus, Woodend and Waikuku.

References

Sources
 

Waimakariri District
Populated places in Canterbury, New Zealand